“We Stand As One” is a limited single by Denise Ho, released as a collection for her fans to celebrate the success of her first concert at the Hong Kong Coliseum, Live in Unity 2006. It mainly consists of 2 songs - "The Illuminus Organization (光明會)" and "Ponte dei Sospiri / Bridge of Sigh (嘆息橋)" both composed by Denise Ho.  The single also has 4 distinct mixes of "The Illuminus Organization (光明會)", each newly arranged and recorded by the 4 members of her band, Green Mountain Orchestra (GMO).  The original version of the song in track 1 is arranged and produced by all the members together, conveying the message that Denise wants to express "Living in Unity".

Songs 

光明會 (The Illuminus Organization) (The Original)
光明會 (The Illuminus Organization) (Featuring Ying C Foo)
光明會 (The Illuminus Organization) (Featuring Harris Ho)
光明會 (The Illuminus Organization) (Featuring Veronica Lee)
光明會 (The Illuminus Organization) (Featuring Carl Wong)
嘆息橋 (Bridge of Sigh)

Stickers included:

See also
 YesAsia
 HOCC WEB! We Stand As One

Denise Ho albums
2007 albums